Shorter is a town in Macon County, Alabama, United States. At the 2020 census the population was 385, down from 474 at the 2010 census. According to the 1990 U.S. Census records, it was incorporated in 1984.

Geography

The center of town lies on a low ridge which drains south to Cubahatchee Creek and north to Calebee Creek, both of which are west-flowing tributaries of the Tallapoosa River.

Demographics

As of the census of 2000, there were 355 people, 121 households, and 93 families residing in the town. The racial makeup of the town was 82% Black or African American, 16% White, 1% Native American, and 1% from two or more races.

There were 121 households, out of which 36% had children under the age of 18 living with them, 42% were married couples living together, 30% had a female householder with no husband present, and 23% were non-families. 21% of all households were made up of individuals, and 7% had someone living alone who was 65 years of age or older. The average household size was 2.93 and the average family size was 3.45.

In the town, the population was spread out, with 33% under the age of 18, 8% from 18 to 24, 31% from 25 to 44, 20% from 45 to 64, and 8% who were 65 years of age or older. The median age was 33 years. For every 100 females, there were 81.1 males. For every 100 females age 18 and over, there were 80.3 males.

The median income for a household in the town was $18,929, and the median income for a family was $37,188. Males had a median income of $26,667 versus $17,000 for females. The per capita income for the town was $10,630. About 28% of families and 31% of the population were below the poverty line, including 47% of those under age 18 and 43% of those age 65 or over.

Notable persons
 Morris Dees,  co-founder and chief trial counsel for the Southern Poverty Law Center

References

External links

Towns in Macon County, Alabama
Towns in Alabama
Columbus metropolitan area, Georgia
Populated places established in 1984